Salesbrook (sometimes written 'Sales Brook' or archaically 'Sailsbrook'. Occasionally referred to by the Welsh version of the name Nant Acsiynau) is a small settlement in the parish of Newhall, near the village of Aston, in the ceremonial county of Cheshire and the unitary authority of Cheshire East in England. Nearby settlements include Aston by Wrenbury, Newhall, Barnett Brook and Dodd's Green.

Description

The settlement is centred on the Salesbrook brook, which Salesbrook Lane crosses at Salesbrook Bridge. The village consists of two main properties: Salesbrook Manor, and the bungalow, occupied by the Parker family who have lived on the property for  many hundreds of years. There is a row of old  council houses near the main road. Most of the surrounding fields are owned by the Shore family, who live at Salesbrook Farm. The surrounding land is flat (although it begins to slope gently upwards towards Newhall) and mostly used for arable farming. There is a small woodland nearby named Courts Gorse. The population, excluding Salesbrook Farm, was estimated at 16 in 2010.

Governance
The hamlet is served locally by Newhall Parish council which meets at Aston. Local representatives have included Jack Parker from Salesbrook. The council was served by the Crewe and Nantwich Borough Council until its abolition in 2009, since then it has been under the jurisdiction of Cheshire east Council. It is represented in the House of Commons as part of the Eddisbury Constituency.

History
The settlement was part of the Combermere estate until the early 20th century when it was sold off to pay off the estate's mounting debts. Until the 1980s the surrounding land was owned by the Plant family.

Hamlets in Cheshire